"Last Voyage" Live at Innercity: Amsterdam RAI Tiësto
The Last Voyage (Doctor Who) audio Doctor Who story
The Last Voyage 1960 American disaster film